Madichel is a village in Vilavancode taluk, Kanniyakumari district, Tamil Nadu, India. The village is near Kuzhithurai, a historical seaport where merchants came from across the Arabian sea in ancient times.

Geography

Madichel spreads over an area of 3 km². The river Thamaraparani of Madichel is very clear and every season even in harsh summer, the river remains just the same. Madichel never thus lack in water. As it is a gift to the people of the surrounding, agriculture is quite common here. We can find at least few trees in every house and people are very much interested in agriculture. The land is fertile with plenty of water. Madichel is blessed with the presence of the Thamaraparani river.

Agriculture plays a major role in the income of this village. The Thamaraparani river and the Kheeram kulam (pond) are the main source of water for irrigation. Paddy, banana plants, coconut trees, vegetables, fruits and rubber are the major cultivation in this village. Apart from agriculture goldsmithing and carpentry are also a major occupation of village people here. The village has a vast area of paddy fields, cultivation crops and useful trees with rock boundaries.

Religion
Madichel contains an equal population of Hindus and Christians, who live with in unity and prosperity.

The very famous temple of Karachivilai Sreekandan Sastha temple is located in Madichel, in which the historical event of Mandala pooja happens here with lot of miracles at the month of December. This temple got 18 steps as well as a building structure which is similar to that of world-famous temple Sabarimala. This temple is famous for an ancient devotional song called villupattu (bowsong).The temple of minnamcode Sastha is also another attraction of devotees.

CSI church of Palavilai, Ethavilai church, Sacred Heart Forane church Padanthalumoodu, Holy Trinity Church Thiruthuvapuram are very famous churches situated around this village. CSI church of Marthandam stands for its fame in nearest city Marthandam.

School
Government high school of Madichel is situated at the heart of this village. Nearest village of Padanthalumood, includes the TCK Higher secondary School, Sacred Heart Matri Higher Secondary School, St. Joseph's Higher Secondary school Thirutuvapuram and Infant Jesus school Thrithuvapuram, Vilavancode Higher secondary school, Kuzhithurai.

Colleges
 Sree Devi Kumari Women's College Kuzhithurai
 Nesamony Memorial Christian College, Marthandam (from 1964 to present) run by the Kanyakumari Diocese of the Church of South India.
 Grace College of Nursing & Education

Culture 
The culture is a mixture of Tamil and Malayalam culture and traditions. Everyone respects every one of all religions and together take part in all festivals like Vavubali.

Languages
People of this village generally know both Tamil and Malayalam languages, because of its proximity to the border state of Kerala. Tamil and Malayalam are widely spoken by the people. These two languages along with English are used as a medium of teaching in all major schools. The Tamil spoken here is a mix of Malayalam and Tamil, sometimes unintelligible to the people of North Tamil Nadu.

Food
The major food in this area is rice, fish and tapioca. The taste is very different and delicious due to the mixture of Tamil and Malayalam culture and traditions. Food prepared here is also a mix of Kerala/Tamil Nadu traditions. Fish with tapioca, puttu, appam, dosa, idli, idiappam are very popular food items here and so are rice murukku, neyyappam, ilai appam, achchappam, vaalakka pachi, puruppu vadai, Mothagam, Ulunthu vadai, churukk etc. Even curries here are made with coconut and coconut oil which is now considered Kerala style cooking. The vegetables and fruits are naturally fertilised here and tasty. Due to the availability of fresh and natural foods, the people of Madichel are happy and healthy. It is famous for wild honey and freshly roasted cashew nuts served by ladies with beautiful earstuds. This village is a favourite rest area near to the NH 47 road to the famous Kanyakumari beach. Good place for relaxation and meditation on the way from trivandrum to Kanyakumari (Cape comorin)

Folk arts
Bow Song (Villu Paatu) is an ancient form of musical - story - telling art of southern Tamil Nadu. Villu Paatu has been especially popular in Thovalai (famous for fresh flowers like jasmine) and neighbouring areas of the district.

Cashew factories and brick stone factories are found across the village in vast numbers.

Madichel stands for the mixed culture of both Tamil Nadu and Kerala. One of the remarkable tradition in this village is the relaxing and refreshing shelters called Vazhiambalams provided as a charity work to the villagers in last centuries by ancient tharavad of Ambhalathu Vilai veedu. The culture of being beloved to the strangers to this village is very common.

Sports
Kabadi, Coco, Seventy, Vattu, Thallu pillu, Paandi and Kachi (Goli) are the traditional games played by these peoples. But nowadays cricket is becoming most played game in this village.

Social activities
Youngsters in this village are contributing their social works on humanistic grounds through many federations called Narpani mantram.

Structures

Hospitals
Kunneth hospital and research centre in madichel is a well known hospital which is famous for its treatment for diabetes. RV Hospital Thirutuvapuram

Theater
Marthandam Anand Kuzhithurai Lakshmi Padanthaalumoodu IMP Kaliyakkavilai Little Thamines Kaliyakkavilai Richu Thamines Are the important movie theater's around this village.

Airport
Trivandrum International Airport is the nearest airport & 34 km from the village. It is an approx 1 hour drive from the village.

Transportation
Ananthapuri Train No:6123 from Chennai (Time :17:15 towards Chennai) Train No:6124 from Trivandram (Trivandrum to Chennai) and Guruvayur Exp (Time: 8:00 towards chennai) (Guruvayur to Chennai) will stop at this station. Kuzhithurai (2 km from Madichel) is next stop from Eraniel towards Trivandrum.

References

https://archive.today/20130108072409/http://www.postofficelocator.co.in/pincode-search-post-office/tamil-nadu/kanyakumari/madichel/V/

Villages in Kanyakumari district